Handial Union is a union council in Chatmohar Upazila, Bangladesh. One of the village in the union council is Nobin village.

References

Populated places in Rajshahi Division